42nd Street is a 1933 American pre-Code musical film directed by Lloyd Bacon, and a script by Rian James and James Seymour (plus uncredited contributions by Whitney Bolton), adapted from the 1932 novel of the same name by Bradford Ropes. Starring an ensemble cast of Warner Baxter, Bebe Daniels, George Brent, Ruby Keeler, Dick Powell and Ginger Rogers, the film revolved around the rehearsals of a Broadway show at the height of the Great Depression, and its cast and crew. The film was choreographed by Busby Berkeley, with music by Harry Warren and lyrics by Al Dubin.

This backstage musical was very successful at the box office and is now a classic. The film was nominated for the Academy Award for Best Picture at the 6th Academy Awards. In 1998, it was selected for preservation in the United States National Film Registry by the Library of Congress as being "culturally, historically, or aesthetically significant". In 2006, it ranked 13th on the American Film Institute's list of best musicals. A stage adaption of the film debuted on Broadway in 1980, winning two Tony Awards, including Best Musical.

Plot 

It is 1932, the depth of the Great Depression, and noted Broadway producers Jones and Barry are putting on Pretty Lady, a musical starring Dorothy Brock. She is involved with wealthy Abner Dillon, the show's "angel" (financial backer), but while she is busy keeping him both hooked and at arm's length, she is secretly seeing her old vaudeville partner, out-of-work Pat Denning.

Julian Marsh is hired to direct, although his doctor warns that he risks his life if he continues in his high-pressure profession. Despite a long string of successes he's broke, a result of the 1929 Stock Market Crash, so he must make his last show a hit, in order to have enough money to retire.

Cast selection and rehearsals begin amidst fierce competition, with not a few "casting couch" innuendos flying around. Naïve newcomer Peggy Sawyer, who arrives in New York from her home in Allentown, Pennsylvania, is duped and ignored until two experienced chorines, Lorraine Fleming and Ann "Anytime Annie" Lowell, take her under their wing. Lorraine is assured a job because of her relationship with dance director Andy Lee; she also sees to it that Ann and Peggy are chosen. The show's juvenile lead, Billy Lawler, takes an immediate liking to Peggy (after her being tricked into bursting into his dressing room), as does Pat.

When Marsh learns about Dorothy's relationship with Pat, he sends some thugs led by his gangster friend Slim Murphy to rough him up. That, plus her realization that their situation is unhealthy, makes Dorothy and Pat agree not to see each other for a while. He gets a stock job in Philadelphia.

Rehearsals continue for five weeks, to Marsh's complete dissatisfaction, until the night before the show's surprise opening in Philadelphia, when Dorothy breaks her ankle. By the next morning, Abner has quarreled with her and wants Marsh to replace her with his new girlfriend, Annie. Annie confesses in earnest that she can't carry the show, but convinces the director that the inexperienced Peggy can. With 200 jobs and his future riding on the outcome, a desperate Julian rehearses Peggy mercilessly until an hour before the premiere, vowing "I'll either have a live leading lady or a dead chorus girl."

Billy finally gets up the nerve to tell Peggy he loves her. They embrace and kiss, just as Dorothy shows up and walks through the door.  Surprisingly, she wishes Peggy the best of luck and reveals that she and Pat are finally getting married. The show goes on to rousing applause. The last twenty minutes of the film are devoted to three Busby Berkeley production numbers: "Shuffle Off to Buffalo", "(I'm) Young and Healthy", and "42nd Street".

The show is a hit. As the theater audience comes out, Julian stands in the shadows outside the stage door, hearing comments that Peggy is the star and that he, the director, doesn't deserve the credit for the show's success.

Plot note
In the original Bradford Ropes novel, Julian and Billy are lovers. Since same-sex relationships were unacceptable in films by the moral standards of the era, the studio substituted a romance between Billy and Peggy. Although in one scene a gay innuendo is presented, as director Marsh puts his arm over choreographer Andy Lee's shoulder and asks if he has a date for the evening, who replies "No." Immediately Marsh replies, "Come on home with me will you? I'm lonesome."

Cast 

The film's uncredited cast includes Harry Akst as Jerry, Adele Lacy as a chorus girl, Guy Kibbee's brother Milton, Louise Beavers, Lyle Talbot, George Irving and Charles Lane. Dubin and Warren, who wrote the film's songs, make cameo appearances.

Production 

The film was Ruby Keeler's first, and the first time that Berkeley, Warren and Dubin had worked for Warner Bros.  Director Lloyd Bacon was not the first choice to direct – he replaced Mervyn LeRoy when LeRoy became ill. LeRoy was dating Ginger Rogers at the time, and had suggested to her that she take the role of "Anytime Annie".

Actors who were considered for lead roles when the film was being cast include Warren William and Richard Barthelmess for the role of Julian Marsh, eventually played by Warner Baxter; Kay Francis and Ruth Chatterton instead of Bebe Daniels for the role of Dorothy Brock; Loretta Young as Peggy Sawyer instead of Ruby Keeler; Joan Blondell instead of Ginger Rogers for Anytime Annie; Glenda Farrell for the role of Lorraine, played by Una Merkel, and Frank McHugh instead of the diminutive George E. Stone as Andy, the dance director.

The film began production on October 5, 1932. The shooting schedule ran for 28 days at the Warner Bros. studio in Burbank, California. The total cost of making it has been estimated to be $340,000–$439,000.

Musical numbers 

All songs have music by Harry Warren and lyrics by Al Dubin.
 "You're Getting to Be a Habit with Me" – sung by Bebe Daniels
 "It Must Be June" – sung by Bebe Daniels, Dick Powell and the chorus
 "Shuffle Off to Buffalo" Song Clip – sung and danced by Ruby Keeler and Clarence Nordstrom, with Ginger Rogers, Una Merkel and the chorus,
 "Young and Healthy" – sung by Dick Powell to Toby Wing and the chorus,
 "42nd Street" – sung and danced by Ruby Keeler, and sung by Dick Powell

The "Love Theme", written by Harry Warren, is played under scenes between Ruby Keeler and Dick Powell, and Bebe Daniels and George Brent. It has no title or lyrics, and is unpublished.

The music playing during dance rehearsals and the opening of the show is an instrumental piano piece that Harry Warren wrote, titled "Pretty Lady."

A special patter with different music was written for the song "Forty-Second Street" and the production number of same, with music by Warren and lyrics by Dubin. It was cut for unknown reasons from the finished film, but an unpublished manuscript of this still exists.

Reception 
The film premiered in New York on March 9, 1933, at the Strand Theatre, and went into general release two days later, becoming one of the most profitable films of the year, bringing in an estimated gross of $2,300,000, equal to $ today. According to Warner Bros. records, the film earned $1,438,000 domestically and $843,000 abroad. It received Oscar nominations for Best Picture and Best Sound Recording, and was named one of the 10 Best Films of 1933 by Film Daily.

Mordaunt Hall of The New York Times called the film "invariably entertaining" and, "The liveliest and one of the most tuneful screen musical comedies that has come out of Hollywood".

The New York World-Telegram described it as "A sprightly entertainment, combining, as it did, a plausible enough story of back-stage life, some excellent musical numbers and dance routines and a cast of players that are considerably above the average found in screen musicals."

"Every element is professional and convincing", wrote Variety. "It'll socko the screen musical fans with the same degree that Metro's pioneering screen musicals did."

John Mosher of The New Yorker called it "a bright movie" with "as pretty a little fantasy of Broadway as you may hope to see", and praised Baxter's performance as "one of the best he has given us", though he described the plot as "the most conventional one to be found in such doings."

42nd Street continued to win praise in the decades after its release.

Review aggregator Rotten Tomatoes gives the film a 96% rating based on 25 reviews. Its Critic Consensus reads: " Berkeley does it again in 42nd Street, a brilliant depression-era romp with stellar musical numbers and impeccable choreography."

Critic Pauline Kael wrote,  "[It] gave life to the clichés that have kept parodists happy."

On January 14, 2004, Dennis Schwartz observed:  "The musical film was changed forever by this innovative one, while due to its tremendous box office appeal it not only saved Warner Brothers from bankruptcy but made it into a major studio. Busby Berkeley … created numbers tailored-made for this film that exceeded the previous conventional limits... One can't say enough good things about what Busby Berkeley did for the musical...The unneeded melodramatics get in the way of the musical numbers and the fun atmospheric backstage happenings. But when the music is blasting away, this becomes a magical picture and all is forgiven."

On April 10, 2020, in The New Yorker, listing the best films to stream during the Covid-19 pandemic, Richard Brody observes: "Modern musicals start here, and Busby Berkeley's genius bursts into full flower."

Stage adaptation 

In 1980, the film was adapted into a stage musical by Harry Warren and Al Dubin. It featured additional songs by Warren and lyrics by Dublin and Johnny Mercer and a book by Michael Stewart and Mark Bramble. The original Broadway production directed and choreographed by Gower Champion (whose death on opening night was announced at the curtain call by producer David Merrick) won the Tony Award for Best Musical. Since then, it has been produced both regionally and professionally around the world. The soundtrack included all musical numbers from the film besides "June."

Awards and honors 

American Film Institute recognition
 2004 – AFI's 100 Years...100 Songs:
 "42nd Street", # 97
 2005 – AFI's 100 Years...100 Movie Quotes:
 "Sawyer, you're going out a youngster, but you've got to come back a star!", # 87
 2006 – AFI's Greatest Movie Musicals – # 13

See also 
 42nd Street, the actual street in New York City

References

External links 

 
 
 
 
 

1933 films
1930s romantic musical films
American black-and-white films
American romantic musical films
Films about musical theatre
Films adapted into plays
Films based on American novels
Films based on romance novels
Films directed by Lloyd Bacon
Films produced by Darryl F. Zanuck
Films set in 1932
Films set in New York City
Films shot in Los Angeles County, California
United States National Film Registry films
Warner Bros. films
Backstage musicals
1930s English-language films
1930s American films